Anastrophe (from the , anastrophē, "a turning back or about") is a figure of speech in which the normal word order of the subject, the verb, and the object is changed.

For example, subject–verb–object ("I like potatoes") might be changed to object–subject–verb ("potatoes I like").

Examples 
Because English has a settled natural word order, anastrophe emphasizes the displaced word or phrase. For example, the name of the City Beautiful urbanist movement emphasises "beautiful". Similarly, in "This is the forest primeval", from Henry Wadsworth Longfellow's Evangeline, the emphasis is on "primeval".

If the emphasis that comes from anastrophe is not an issue, the synonym inversion is perfectly suitable.

Anastrophe is common in Ancient Greek and Latin poetry, such as in the first line of the Aeneid:

Arma virumque cano, Troiæ qui primus ab oris
("I sing of arms and the man, who first from the shores of Troy")

In the example, the genitive case noun Troiæ ("of Troy") has been separated from the noun that it governs (oris, "shores") in a way that would be rather unusual in Latin prose. In fact, the liberty of Latin word order allows "of Troy" to be taken to modify "arms" or "the man" but is not customarily interpreted so.  

Anastrophe also occurs in English poetry, as in the third verse of Samuel Taylor Coleridge's The Rime of the Ancient Mariner:

He holds him with his skinny hand,
"There was a ship," quoth he.
"Hold off! unhand me, grey-beard loon!"
Eftsoons his hand dropt he.

The word order of "his hand dropt he" is not the customary word order in English, even in the archaic English that Coleridge seeks to imitate. Also, excessive use of the device if the emphasis is unnecessary or even unintended, especially for the sake of rhyme or metre, is usually considered a flaw, such as the clumsy versification of Sternhold and Hopkins's metrical psalter:

The earth is all the Lord's, with all
her store and furniture;
Yea, his is all the work, and all
that therein doth endure:

For he hath fastly founded it
above the seas to stand,
And placed below the liquid floods,
to flow beneath the land.   

However, some poets have a style that depends on heavy use of anastrophe.  Gerard Manley Hopkins is particularly identified with the device, which renders his poetry susceptible to parody:

Hope holds to Christ the mind's own mirror out	
To take His lovely likeness more and more.

When anastrophe draws an adverb to the head of a thought, such as for emphasis, the verb is drawn along. That causes a verb-subject inversion:
"Never have I found the limits of the photographic potential. Every horizon, upon being reached, reveals another beckoning in the distance" (W. Eugene Smith).
In Robert Frost's "Mending Wall," the poem's opening clause begins with an object noun, and yet this inversion does not occur, effectively creating a tension that is worked against through the rest of the poem:
"Something there is that doesn't love a wall..."

A popular cultural example of anastrophe would be Yoda from the Star Wars series.
“Powerful you have become, the dark side I sense in you.”

See also 

 Hyperbaton

References

Sources

External links

Figures of rhetoric: Anastrophe
https://modernamericanpoetry.org/criticism/lawrence-raab-mending-wall

Rhetorical techniques
Poetic devices
Word order

pl:Przestawnia